Coffeen may refer to:

 Coffeen, Illinois, United States
 Henry A. Coffeen (1841-1912), American politician
 William and Helen Coffeen House, Illinois, United States